The École nationale supérieure d'ingénieurs de Caen & Centre de Recherche (ENSICAEN), which translates as National Graduate School of Engineering & Research Center, is one of the French grandes écoles, whose main purpose is to form chemical, electronical, and Computer science engineers  (with a level "bac+5"). It is located on the city of Caen, Normandy.

Graduate specializations 

The school delivers five engineering degrees accredited by the French Commission des titres d'ingénieur:

 electronics and applied physics
 computer science
 chemical engineering
 industrial engineering
 mechanical and materials engineering

In general, the obtained degrees are internationally recognized as equivalent to masters of science, for instance in the United States.

References

External links 

 Official website

Caen
Universities and colleges in Caen
Educational institutions established in 1976
1976 establishments in France